This is a list of universities in Palau.

Universities 
 Pacific Islands University (Palau campus)
 Palau Community College

See also 
 List of universities by country

References

Palau
Palau
Universities
Universities